Amydria abscensella is a moth of the family Acrolophidae. It is found in Venezuela.

References

Moths described in 1863
Acrolophidae